Åfoss is a village in Skien municipality, Norway. It is located near the outlet of the lake Norsjø.

From 1837 Åfoss was administratively a part of Solum municipality. Solum became a part of Skien municipality on 1 January 1964.

Villages in Vestfold og Telemark